"Blazhen Muzh" (Church Slavonic: Блажен муж, "Blessed is the Man") is a setting of verses from Psalms 1, 2, and 3 taken from the Byzantine (Eastern Orthodox and Greek-Catholic) tradition of Vespers. As with many of the Psalms and hymns, "Blazhen Muzh" attracted the attention of composers.

Text of the hymn
The version below is the one set by Sergei Rachmaninoff in his All-Night Vigil.

Eastern Christian hymns
Psalm settings